Rubén Juan Pellanda (26 August 1928 – 1 December 2012) was de facto Federal Interventor of Córdoba, Argentina from January 20, 1982 to December 11, 1983.

References

1928 births
2012 deaths
Place of birth missing
Governors of Córdoba Province, Argentina